Stone of Destiny is a 1948 book by Ion Idriess about the Australian diamond industry.

References

External links
Stone of Destiny at AustLit

1948 non-fiction books
Australian non-fiction books
Books by Ion Idriess
Diamond mining
Mining in Western Australia
Angus & Robertson books